Dimitrije "Dima" Injac (born 12 August 1980) is a Serbian football midfielder.

Club career
His former clubs were OFK Kikinda, FK Kabel, FK Vojvodina, FK Bečej and FK Slavija Sarajevo.

In January 2007, he joined Lech Poznań on a three-year contract.

On 24 August 2012, Injac signed a two-year contract with Polonia Warsaw.

International career
He made his national debut in February 2011 against Israel.

Career statistics

Honours
Lech Poznań
 Ekstraklasa: 2009–10
 Polish Cup: 2008–09
 Polish SuperCup:  2009

References

External links
 
 
 Profile on Lech Poznan official site. 
 Profile at Srbijafudbal.
 
 

1983 births
Living people
Sportspeople from Kikinda
Serbian footballers
Association football midfielders
Serbia international footballers
FK Kabel players
OFK Bečej 1918 players
OFK Kikinda players
FK Vojvodina players
FK Slavija Sarajevo players
Lech Poznań players
Polonia Warsaw players
Widzew Łódź players
Ekstraklasa players
Serbian expatriate footballers
Expatriate footballers in Poland
Serbian expatriate sportspeople in Poland